Oyor (Oyoor) is a rural locality (a selo) in Dzhidinsky District, Republic of Buryatia, Russia. The population was 771 as of 2010. There are 19 streets.

Geography 
Oyor is located 25 km southwest of Petropavlovka (the district's administrative centre) by road. Stary Ukyrchelon is the nearest rural locality.

References 

Rural localities in Dzhidinsky District